Predslava of Kiev ( 1104–07) was a Rurikid princess, the daughter of Sviatopolk II, the Grand Prince of Kiev (r. 1093–1113). She married Hungarian prince Álmos, with whom she had three children, one of whom was the later King of Hungary, Béla II (r. 1131–1141).

Family
Predslava married Álmos on August 21, 1104. They had the following children:
Adelaide, ( 1107 – d. after 1140), married Sobieslav I of Bohemia in 1123.
Béla II ( 1109–1141), King of Hungary (r. 1131–1141).
Hedwig, or Sophia ( 1107–1138), married Margrave Adalbert II of Austria in 1132.

References

1090s births
12th-century deaths
Rurik dynasty
Kievan Rus' princesses
12th-century Rus' people
12th-century Rus' women
11th-century Rus' people
11th-century Rus' women
11th-century Hungarian people
11th-century Hungarian women
12th-century Hungarian people
12th-century Hungarian women